Toskool is a village in Jalal-Abad Region of Kyrgyzstan. It is part of Nooken District. Its population was 2,180 in 2021.

References
 

Populated places in Jalal-Abad Region